The Conception Bank silver boa (Chilabothrus argentum), also known as the Conception Bank boa or silver boa, is a species of boa described in May 2016 by a team of researchers from Harvard University. It is only known from the Conception Island Bank in the Bahamas. It is the first known discovery of a West Indian boa species in 73 years. It is named for its unique silver color and the fact that the first specimen was found in a silver palm.

Description
Conception Bank silver boa has silver to tan dorsal background coloration, with or without scattered dark brown scales. Ventral scales are pure cream-white. They measure   in snout–vent length and weigh .

Habitat and conservation
The Conception Bank silver boa is largely arboreal and has been found in silver palm Coccothrinax argentata and gumbo-limbo Bursera simaruba. The species is known from six individuals encountered in July 2015 by a research team from Harvard University, and from the type series of two individuals collected in October 2015. It has been assessed by the International Union for Conservation of Nature (IUCN) and is considered "Critically Endangered" in view of its small area of occurrence as well as potential threats posed by introduced species, habitat loss, and (illegal) pet trade. Some level of protection is offered by the Conception Island Bank being designated as a national park, and by the relative remoteness of the islands.

References 

Chilabothrus
Reptiles of the Bahamas
Endemic fauna of the Bahamas
Reptiles described in 2016
Snakes of the Caribbean